Wissler is a surname. Notable people with the surname include:

Clark Wissler (1870–1947), American anthropologist
Janina Wissler (born 1983), German model, actress and television host
Janine Wissler (born 1981), German politician
John Wissler, American lieutenant general
Susan Wissler (1853-1939), American politician

See also
Susan Wissler House
Wissler's syndrome

German-language surnames
Surnames of German origin